The Propagandists were a nineteenth-century political group in The United Kingdom  led by the Radical ex-Chartist John Bedford Leno. They would speak on behalf of common workers in legal and social matters and met weekly at the "Windsor Castle" pub in Holborn.

It was from the "Propagandists" that the Reform League was later established in 1865 to press for manhood suffrage and the ballot.

References
 The Aftermath with Autobiography of the Author (John Bedford Leno) published ny Reeves & Turner, London, 1892.

Political movements
Protests in the United Kingdom
Political history of the United Kingdom